Billy Williamson may refer to:

Billy Williamson (footballer, born 1922) (1922–2006), Scottish footballer (Rangers, St. Mirren and Stirling Albion)
Billy Williamson (footballer, born 1952), Scottish footballer (Aberdeen, Dundee United and Dundee)
Billy Williamson (guitarist) (1925–1996), American guitarist
Billy P. Williamson, American football coach, 1898

See also
 William Williamson (disambiguation)